Michelle Vittese (born December 6, 1989) is an American field hockey player. At the 2012 and 2016 Summer Olympics, she competed for the United States women's national field hockey team in the women's event. She was born in Philadelphia.

Background
Vittese grew up in Cherry Hill, New Jersey and graduated from Camden Catholic High School in 2008. She played field hockey for the University of Virginia and graduated with a major in history. She currently resides in Lancaster, Pennsylvania. In June 2016, she was part of the USA women's national team that finished with a bronze medal at the 2016 Champion's Trophy in London. Recently, Vittese led her team to win the bronze medal in the Pan American Cup against Canada in August 2017.

References

External links
 

1989 births
Living people
American female field hockey players
Olympic field hockey players of the United States
Field hockey players at the 2011 Pan American Games
Field hockey players at the 2012 Summer Olympics
Field hockey players at the 2016 Summer Olympics
People from Cherry Hill, New Jersey
Sportspeople from Camden County, New Jersey
Pan American Games gold medalists for the United States
Virginia Cavaliers field hockey players
Pan American Games medalists in field hockey
Female field hockey midfielders
Medalists at the 2011 Pan American Games